Euclides Vieira (2 May 1883 - 11 September 1967) was a Brazilian engineer and politician. He was mayor of Campinas and senator for São Paulo by the Social Progressive Party (PSP).

References 

20th-century Brazilian engineers
Social Progressive Party politicians
Members of the Federal Senate (Brazil)
1883 births
1967 deaths
People from Itapira